The following radio stations broadcast on FM frequency 106.3 MHz:

Argentina
 Aleluya in Buenos Aires
 Centro in Oberá, Misiones
 Gamba in Córdoba
 Güemes in Salta
 Independencia in Villa Mercedes, San Luis
 isla del Cerrito in Resistencia, Chaco
 La 100 Mar del Plata in Mar del Plata, Buenos Aires
 La1063FM in Villa San José, Entre Ríos
 Líder in Salta
 Metro Bahia in Bahía Blanca, Buenos Aires
 Milenium in Buenos Aires
 Radio 10 Rosario in Rosario, Santa Fe
 RKM Mendoza in Mendoza
 Romance in San Miguel de Tucumán
 San Expedito in Jardín América, Misiones
 Tropical in Rawson, Chubut

Australia
 4RGT in Townsville, Queensland
 ABC Classic FM in Rockhampton, Queensland
 ABC Northern Tasmania in Rosebery, Tasmania
 ABC South East NSW in Eden, New South Wales
3CCS in Colac, Victoria
Flow FM in Healesville, Victoria
 Radio National in Sale, Victoria
 SBS Radio in Adelaide, South Australia

Belize
Mood FM

Canada (Channel 292)
 CBV-FM in Quebec City, Quebec
 CFXN-FM in North Bay, Ontario
 CHKS-FM in Sarnia, Ontario
 CIFM-FM-7 in Pritchard, British Columbia
 CINS-FM in North Sydney, Nova Scotia
 CINU-FM in Truro, Nova Scotia
 CIPB-FM in Port aux Basques, Newfoundland and Labrador
 CIRJ-FM in Kingston, Ontario
 CISB-FM in Marius, Manitoba
 CJBC-5-FM in Peterborough, Ontario
 CJVR-FM-2 in Waskesiu Lake, Saskatchewan
 CKAV-FM-2 in Vancouver, British Columbia
 CKGR-FM in Golden, British Columbia
 CKIN-FM in Montreal, Quebec
 VF2214 in Luscar, Alberta
CBD-FM-1 in St. Stephen,  New Brunswick

China 
 CNR The Voice of China in Kaifeng

Mexico
 XHETE-FM in Tehuacán, Puebla
 XHHDH-FM in Santa María Huatulco, Oaxaca
 XHIS-FM in Ciudad Guzmán, Jalisco
 XHITO-FM in Irapuato, Guanajuato
 XHLAYA-FM in Playa del Carmen, Quintana Roo
 XHPSP-FM in Piedras Negras, Coahuila
 XHRVI-FM in Ixtacomitán, Tabasco
 XHSCCV-FM in San Fernando, Chiapas
 XHSCFF-FM in Tlaxcala, Tlaxcala
 XHSIAA-FM in Santa María Yucuhiti, Oaxaca
 XHSIBY-FM in Mecatlán, Veracruz
 XHZIT-FM in Zitácuaro, Michoacán

New Zealand 
 Beach FM in the Kapiti Coast

Philippines
DZVA in Calamba City
DWBQ in Naga City
DWHR in Dagupan City
DYBE-FM in Bacolod City
DYYD in Dumaguete City
DYAM-FM in Toledo City, Cebu
DYOD in Ormoc City
DXHY in Cagayan de Oro City
DXIQ in Malaybalay City, Bukidnon
DXDI in Digos City
DXKM in General Santos City
DXCA BELL-FM in Pagadian City

United Kingdom
 Bridge FM in Bridgend, South Wales
 MKFM in Bletchley Stadium, in Milton Keynes

United States (Channel 292)
 KALI-FM in Santa Ana, California
 KBBL in Cazadero, California
 KBLK-LP in Shreveport, Louisiana
 KBMG in Evanston, Wyoming
 KBZS in Wichita Falls, Texas
 KCSY in Twisp, Washington
 KDBR in Kalispell, Montana
 KFRX in Lincoln, Nebraska
 KGAM (FM) in Merced, California
 KGMX in Lancaster, California
 KGOU in Norman, Oklahoma
 KHIJ-LP in Ottumwa, Iowa
 KHKZ in San Benito, Texas
 KIDJ in Sugar City, Idaho
 KIFT in Kremmling, Colorado
 KINS-FM in Blue Lake, California
 KIYS in Walnut Ridge, Arkansas
 KJBX in Cash, Arkansas
 KJZS-LP in Bozeman, Montana
 KKHR in Abilene, Texas
 KKLI in Widefield, Colorado
 KLBC in Durant, Oklahoma
 KLEN in Cheyenne, Wyoming
 KLOO-FM in Corvallis, Oregon
 KLXH in Thibodaux, Louisiana
 KMED in Eagle Point, Oregon
 KMJV in Soledad, California
 KMLR in Gonzales, Texas
 KOLL in Lonoke, Arkansas
 KOMR in Sun City, Arizona
 KOOC in Belton, Texas
 KPAN-FM in Hereford, Texas
 KPHR in Ortonville, Minnesota
 KPQW in Willows, California
 KPRB in Brush, Colorado
 KPSO-FM in Falfurrias, Texas
 KDBI-FM in Homedale, Idaho
 KRZK in Branson, Missouri
 KSEM in Seminole, Texas
 KSUP in Juneau, Alaska
 KTGV in Oracle, Arizona
 KUFW in Kingsburg, California
 KVHT in Vermillion, South Dakota
 KVSU in Desert Hills, Arizona
 KVYB in Oak View, California
 KWNZ in Lovelock, Nevada
 KWOF in Waukomis, Oklahoma
 KWRJ-LP in Elton, Louisiana
 KWWY in Shoshoni, Wyoming
 KXNO-FM in Ankeny, Iowa
 KXOT in Los Lunas, New Mexico
 KYGL in Texarkana, Arkansas
 KYMK-FM in Maurice, Louisiana
 KZKZ-FM in Greenwood, Arkansas
 KZLK in Rapid City, South Dakota
 WAIG-LP in Daytona Beach, Florida
 WAMX in Milton, West Virginia
 WBTG-FM in Sheffield, Alabama
 WBUK in Ottawa, Ohio
 WCDA in Versailles, Kentucky
 WCDK in Cadiz, Ohio
 WCDQ in Crawfordsville, Indiana
 WCEM-FM in Cambridge, Maryland 
 WCIF in Melbourne, Florida
 WCIT-FM in Oneida, New York
 WCTL in Erie, Pennsylvania
 WDBF-FM in Mount Union, Pennsylvania
 WDMT in Marlinton, West Virginia
 WEAG-FM in Starke, Florida
 WEIB in Northampton, Massachusetts
 WEPB-LP in Noblesville, Indiana
 WEVR-FM in River Falls, Wisconsin
 WFNQ in Nashua, New Hampshire
 WGCY in Gibson City, Illinois
 WGER in Saginaw, Michigan
 WGHR in Spring Hill, Florida
 WGLM-FM in Lakeview, Michigan
 WGMK in Donalsonville, Georgia
 WGMV in Stephenson, Michigan
 WGNG in Tchula, Mississippi
 WHCY in Blairstown, New Jersey
 WHKX in Bluefield, Virginia
 WHTD in London, Ohio
 WHXR in Scarborough, Maine
 WIOP-LP in Shepherdsville, Kentucky
 WIPU-LP in Pembroke Pines, Florida
 WJNI (FM) in Ladson, South Carolina
 WJPN-LP in Prince William, Virginia
 WJPT in Fort Myers, Florida
 WJSE in North Cape May, New Jersey
 WKBX in Kingsland, Georgia
 WKMK in Eatontown, New Jersey
 WKNU in Brewton, Alabama
 WLCY in Blairsville, Pennsylvania
 WLUG-LP in Anniston, Alabama
 WMFG-FM in Hibbing, Minnesota
 WMNA-FM in Gretna, Virginia
 WMTK in Littleton, New Hampshire
 WNBZ-FM in Saranac, New York
 WOAH (FM) in Glennville, Georgia
 WOVO in Horse Cave, Kentucky
 WPFT in Pigeon Forge, Tennessee
 WPLT (FM) in Sarona, Wisconsin
 WPNV-LP in Peoria, Illinois
 WQBZ in Fort Valley, Georgia
 WQCC in La Crosse, Wisconsin
 WQRL in Benton, Illinois
 WQSN in Norton, Virginia
 WQSV-LP in Staunton, Virginia
 WRAZ-FM in Key Largo, Florida
 WRDF in Columbia City, Indiana
 WRFZ-LP in Rochester, New York
 WRIL in Pineville, Kentucky
 WSBZ in Miramar Beach, Florida
 WSRB in Lansing, Illinois
 WTND-LP in Macomb, Illinois
 WTUF in Boston, Georgia
 WUBU in South Bend, Indiana
 WUUB in Jupiter, Florida
 WWKX in Woonsocket, Rhode Island
 WWMK in Onaway, Michigan
 WWMN in Thompsonville, Michigan
 WWQM-FM in Middleton, Wisconsin
 WWTL-LP in Logan, Ohio
 WXMT in Smethport, Pennsylvania
 WXNS-LP in Nashville, Tennessee
 WXOL-LP in Dresden, Tennessee
 WYAY (FM) in Bolivia, North Carolina
 WYMK in Mount Kisco, New York
 WYNN-FM in Florence, South Carolina
 WYRB in Genoa, Illinois
 WYRD-FM in Simpsonville, South Carolina
 WZLD in Petal, Mississippi

References

External links

Lists of radio stations by frequency